Thomas Benjamin Boag (19 September 1914 – 7 March 1977) was an Australian rules footballer who played with Collingwood in the Victorian Football League (VFL).

Notes

External links 

Tommy Boag's profile at Collingwood Forever

1914 births
1977 deaths
Australian rules footballers from Victoria (Australia)
Collingwood Football Club players
People from Stawell, Victoria